Dipterocarpus obtusifolius is a common species of tree in the family Dipterocarpaceae found throughout Southeast Asia, including Andaman Islands, Myanmar, Thailand, Cambodia, Laos and Vietnam.

Three varieties have been identified: var. subnudus Ryan & Kerr; var. glabricalyx Smitinand; and var. vestitus (Wall. ex Dyer) Smitinand. While legitimate, these varieties are as yet of low confidence level. The variety D. obtusifolius var. subnudus  differed by having completely hairless leaves and is found only in the south of Cambodia, Vietnam and Thailand.

Trees are large, up to 30m tall, grow in dry dipterocarp forest, and the red brown wood is used in general construction. In Cambodia, the resin from the tree is used to make torches, drinking water was obtained by cutting young stalks and the wood gave boards regarded as non-durable in construction, while in some areas of the Kompong Chhnang Province it is an important firewood source.

References

obtusifolius
Flora of Indo-China
Trees of Cambodia
Trees of Vietnam
Plants described in 1864
Taxa named by Friedrich Anton Wilhelm Miquel